Amirabad (also Romanized as Amīrābād) is a village in Holayjan Rural District, in the Central District of Izeh County, Khuzestan Province, Iran. At the 2006 census, its population was 120, in 22 families.

References 

Populated places in Izeh County